The 2003 UEFA European Under-17 Championship qualifying competition was an under-17 football competition played in 2002 and 2003 to determine the 7 teams joining Portugal, who qualified automatically as hosts, in the 2003 UEFA European Under-17 Championship final tournament.

The final tournament also acted as the UEFA qualifier for the 2003 FIFA U-17 World Championship in Finland, with two teams qualifying, Portugal and Spain, as finalists.

Format
The qualifying competition consisted of two rounds:
Qualifying round: Apart from six nations (Spain, England, Russia, Finland, Poland and Hungary), which received a bye to the elite round, the remaining 44 teams were drawn into 11 groups of four teams. Each group was played in single round-robin format at one of the teams selected as hosts after the draw. Two best teams from each group advanced to the elite round.
Elite round: The 28 teams were drawn into seven groups of four teams. Each group was played in single round-robin format at one of the teams selected as hosts after the draw. The seven group winners qualified for the final tournament.

Qualifying round

Groups

Group 1

Group 2

Group 3

Group 4

Group 5

Group 6

Group 7

Group 8

Group 9

Group 10

Group 11

Elite round

Groups
All times were CET (UTC+1).

Group 1

Group 2

Group 3

Group 4

Group 5

Group 6

Group 7

Qualified teams
The following 8 teams qualified for the final tournament.

1 Bold indicates champion for that year. Italics indicate host.

Top goalscorers

References

External links

Qualification
2003